The Ymiysky Range is a mountain range in the Verkhoyansk District, Sakha Republic (Yakutia), Far Eastern Federal District, Russia. The nearest airfield is Batagay Airport.

Geography
The Ymiysky Range rises off the northwestern side of the Khadaranya Range, located to the east of the lower course of the Yana River. It is one of the smaller ranges in the northern sector of the Chersky Range. 

The northern end of the ridge rises south east of the confluence of the Oldzho river with the Nenneli, its main tributary. The Kisilyakh Range rises to the southwest of the Nenneli valley.

See also
List of mountains and hills of Russia

References

External links
Landscapes as a reflection of the toponyms of Yakutia
A ski trip along the Chersky Range

Mountain ranges of the Sakha Republic
Chersky Range